Jøssund is a village in the municipality of Flatanger in Trøndelag county, Norway. The population has been declining steadily since World War II, but there is still a shop and cafe in the village.

References

Flatanger
Villages in Trøndelag